The Doll is a 1919 German romantic fantasy comedy film directed by Ernst Lubitsch. The film is based on the operetta La poupée by Edmond Audran (1896) and a line of influence back through the Léo Delibes ballet Coppélia (1870) and ultimately to E. T. A. Hoffmann's short story "Der Sandmann" (1816).

Plot summary
Lancelot is the nephew of the Baron, his uncle. The Baron is pressuring him to get married but Lancelot is afraid of women. He decides to fool his uncle by marrying a life-like mechanical doll instead.

Cast

DVD releases
The film was released in the US by Kino Lorber as part of the box set Lubitsch in Berlin (2007) with English intertitles. It was also released in the UK by Eureka's Masters of Cinema series as part of the box set Lubitsch in Berlin: Fairy-Tales, Melodramas, and Sex Comedies (2010) with German intertitles and English subtitles.

Notes

Bibliography

External links
 
 
 The Doll - with intertitles in English.

1919 films
1919 romantic comedy films
Films of the Weimar Republic
German silent feature films
Films directed by Ernst Lubitsch
Films based on The Sandman (short story)
Films based on operettas
Films based on adaptations
German black-and-white films
UFA GmbH films
German romantic comedy films
1910s fantasy comedy films
German fantasy comedy films
Silent romantic comedy films
1910s German films